The Emtidad Movement or Emtidad, also sometimes translated as the Extension Movement, is an Iraqi political party formed to contest the 2021 parliamentary election.

Foundation 
The party was formed in early December 2020 by Alaa Al Rikabi, a doctor and civil activist with other civil activists inside a tent in Al-Haboubi Square, the stronghold of the 2019–2021 Iraqi protests in the center of Dhi Qar governorate. The idea was establishing a youth civil movement as an alternative to the current political parties that have failed to run the country and have been implicated in crimes of financial corruption, fueling sectarianism and racism, and creating various crises in the country since 2003. The announcement of the movement came in January 2021 and was called  "extension", indicating that the movement's premise stemmed from the demands of the protesters, who demanded the end of sectarianism and state corrupion.

Electoral results 
2021 Iraqi parliamentary election

Although the movement got nearly 300,000 votes, that turned out to be only 9 seats due to the bad distribution of candidates in the polls. The amount of seats however increased from 9, to 16 due to the resignation of the Sadrist MPS freeing up 73 spaces in parliament to those who got second most votes. however the movement suffered many splits leading to many members leaving due to internal disagreements.

References

2020 establishments in Iraq
Centrist parties in Asia
Liberal parties in Iraq
Nationalist parties in Iraq
Political parties established in 2020
Political parties in Iraq
Secularism in Iraq